WAPO may refer to:

 WAPO (FM), a radio station (90.5 FM) licensed to Mt. Vernon, Illinois, United States
 World Anti-Piracy Observatory, a UNESCO program engineered to help combat copyright infringement
 The Washington Post (WaPo), an American daily newspaper